The 2018–19 Welsh League Cup (known for sponsorship purposes as The Nathaniel MG Cup) was the 27th season of the Welsh League cup competition, which was established in 1992.

Played under a regionalised, knock-out format, the 2018–19 competition was the fifth to be held since the tournament was expanded to include clubs from outside the Welsh Premier League. As well as the 12 Welsh Premier League clubs from the previous season, the top five qualifying clubs from the northern and southern feeder leagues would enter the tournament, along with a number of wildcard entrants.

The trophy was won by Premier League side Cardiff Met. who defeated second tier Cambrian & Clydach Vale B. & G.C. 2–0 in Barry. It was the first time Met had won the cup and the first final appearance for Cambrian, who upset four-time defending champions The New Saints in the semi-finals.

First round
Ties were played on 28 August 2018.

The semi-finalists from the previous season, The New Saints, Cardiff Met, Connah's Quay and Newtown received a bye to the second round.

|-

|}

Second round
The draw for this round was made on 31 August. Ties were played between 25 September and 3 October.

|-

|}

Quarter-finals
The draw for this round was made on 3 October, just prior to the last Second Round match between Prestatyn and The New Saints. Ties were played on 30 October.

|-

|}

Semi-finals

The draw for this round was made on 31 October. Ties were played on 23 and 24 November.

|-

|}

Final
The match was played on Saturday 19 January 2019 at Jenner Park, Barry and was shown live on S4C. This was the first time that the final was held at that ground.

Welsh League Cup seasons
League Cup
Wales